Duper Sessions is the third album by Norwegian singer-songwriter and guitarist Sondre Lerche, released in Norway on February 27, 2006, and in the US on March 21, 2006.  The album entered the Billboard Official Top Contemporary Jazz Albums Chart at No. 5. The album was the 4th most added on the CMJ Jazz Chart during the first week of April 2006.

Track listing
All songs by Sondre Lerche unless otherwise noted.

Personnel
Sondre Lerche – vocals, guitar, harmonica
The Faces Down Quartet
Eric Halvorsen – piano
Morten Skage – upright bass
Ole Ludvig Kruger – piano, drums
Kato Ådland – guitar, percussion, pedal steel
Matias J. Monsen – cello
Mari Boine Persen – violin
Jesper Riis – string arrangements
Jørgen Træen – percussion, backing vocals

Footnotes

External links
Sondre Lerche official website
Duper Sessions reviews on Metacritic

2006 albums
Sondre Lerche albums